John B. Turner was an American attorney and one of the first justices appointed to the Oklahoma Supreme Court after statehood was granted in 1907. He was named as Chief Justice and represented the First District (headquartered in Vinita, Oklahoma). Turner, a resident of Vinita, was to serve on the court until 1913. His annual salary was set at $4,000. He did not stand for re-election in 1914.

Early life 
Justice Turner was born in Robertson County, Tennessee on August 13, 1860. Educated at the Tennessee State University in Knoxville, Tennessee, he was admitted to the bar in Linn County, Missouri June 19, 1883. In 1889, Turner moved to Fort Smith, Arkansas, where he lived for the next six years. In 1894, he moved to Vinita (then in Indian Territory).

Career 
Little has been published about Turner's decisions or activities while serving on the court. However, one news article noted that he had written a court opinion establishing that lands allotted by the government to former slaves (freedmen) in the Chickasaw nation were exempt from taxation.  However, another case brought by freedmen of Garvin County to enjoin the collection of taxes on their allotments resulted in a claim that the government never actually allotted the land and, moreover, did not intend to compensate freedmen in the same way as their former owners. The Garvin judge awarded a demurrer based on this claim. By then (1914), Justice W. R. Bleakmore agreed with the Garvin judge and reversed Turner's earlier ruling.

Retirement and death 
Justice Turner and his wife, Flora Belle, retired to Adams, Tennessee in 1930.

Notes

References 

1860 births
1937 deaths
People from Robertson County, Tennessee
People from Linn County, Missouri
People from Fort Smith, Arkansas
People from Vinita, Oklahoma
Tennessee State University alumni
Justices of the Oklahoma Supreme Court